Ohinemuri is a former New Zealand parliamentary electorate. It existed from 1896 to 1928, and was represented by five Members of Parliament.

Population centres
In the 1896 electoral redistribution, rapid population growth in the North Island required the transfer of three  seats from the South Island to the north. Four electorates that previously existed were re-established, and three electorates were established for the first time, including Ohinemuri. The original area included the settlements of Paeroa, Waihi, and Te Aroha.

In the 1902 electoral redistribution, Waihi was lost to the  electorate. In the 1907 electoral redistribution, Waihi came back to the Ohinemuri electorate, but Te Aroha was lost to the  electorate.

History
Alfred Cadman was the electorate's first representative. Cadman retired from the Lower House for appointment to the New Zealand Legislative Council at the end of the parliamentary term in 1899.

Palmer had previously represented the  electorate north of Auckland. Moss was an Independent Liberal who bitterly opposed Premier Richard Seddon.

When the electorate was abolished in 1928, Samuel transferred to the Thames electorate.

Members of Parliament
Key

Election results

1911 election

1908 election

1899 election

 
 
 
 
 
 
 
 

Table footnotes:

Notes

References

Historical electorates of New Zealand
Thames-Coromandel District
1896 establishments in New Zealand
1928 disestablishments in New Zealand